The 1957 U.S. National Championships (now known as the US Open) was a tennis tournament that took place on the outdoor grass courts at the West Side Tennis Club, Forest Hills in New York City, United States. The tournament ran from 30 August until 8 September. It was the 77th staging of the U.S. National Championships, and the fourth Grand Slam tennis event of the year.

Finals

Men's singles

 Malcolm Anderson (AUS) defeated  Ashley Cooper  (AUS) 10–8, 7–5, 6–4

Women's singles

 Althea Gibson (USA) defeated  Louise Brough (USA) 6–3, 6–2

Men's doubles
 Ashley Cooper (AUS) /  Neale Fraser (AUS) defeated  Gardnar Mulloy (USA) /  Budge Patty (USA) 4–6, 6–3, 9–7, 6–3

Women's doubles
 Louise Brough (USA) /  Margaret Osborne duPont (USA) defeated  Althea Gibson (USA) /  Darlene Hard (USA) 6–2, 7–5

Mixed doubles
 Althea Gibson (USA) /   Kurt Nielsen (DEN) defeated  Darlene Hard (USA) /  Bob Howe (AUS) 6–3, 9–7

References

External links
Official US Open website

 
U.S. National Championships
U.S. National Championships (tennis) by year
U.S. National Championships
U.S. National Championships
U.S. National Championships